"Little Tot" is a song by Swedish singer Dotter. It was performed in Melodifestivalen 2021 and made it to the 13 March final. She finished in fourth place in the final, with 105 points.

Charts

References

2021 songs
2021 singles
English-language Swedish songs
Dotter songs
Melodifestivalen songs of 2021
Songs written by Dotter (singer)